The United Premier Soccer League (UPSL) is an American  soccer league that was founded in Santa Ana in Southern California, with teams in regionalized conferences throughout the United States, and recently Canada and Mexico. The league was founded in 2011 by Santa Ana Winds FC President Leonel López as a regional league for teams in Greater Los Angeles, but expanded to include 400 teams from 41 states as of the 2022 season.

Two seasons are played each year, with regional play culminating in a playoff system that crowns a single national champion each season. The league features internal promotion and relegation with up to three levels in some regions; only clubs in the top tier Premier Division are eligible to compete for the national championship.

The league is a National Affiliate member of United States Soccer Federation, and a National League within the larger United States soccer league system.

History
The UPSL was formed in 2011 with 10 teams, and has grown to include over 400 member clubs across the nation. Now featuring numerous MLS U19 teams including LAFC, Philadelphia Union and LA Galaxy, the Premier Division is widely regarded as occupying the unofficial 4th tier of US Soccer. Each UPSL team is independently owned and operated. The league consists of two seasons each calendar year, with the Spring season beginning in March and ending with national playoffs in July, and a Fall season with play beginning in September with national playoffs in December.

UPSL announced it would begin promotion/relegation system beginning in 2017. Teams will compete in two divisions: Pro Premier and Division One.

In November 2016 the UPSL announced the addition of a Colorado conference set to begin in 2017.

In August 2017, the league announced that all eleven clubs of the Premier League of America would be joining the UPSL as a new Midwest Conference. The conference will initiate friendlies during the 2017 Fall Season and begin league play in 2018.

U.S. Open Cup
Former member club PSA Elite is known for reaching the fourth round of the 2014 and the 2015 Lamar Hunt U.S. Open Cup by knocking out higher-level professional teams. Three UPSL teams, La Máquina FC, L.A. Wolves FC, and San Nicolas FC qualified for the 2016 U.S. Open Cup. La Máquina FC advanced to the fourth round (knocking out Portland Timbers U23, Sacramento Gold, and LA Wolves FC) before falling to LA Galaxy. The UPSL's participants in the 2016 US Open Cup altogether defeated teams from the PDL (Timbers U-23), NPSL (Sacramento Gold), and USL (Orange County Blues FC).

League structure
The UPSL operates in a geographical conference structure with localized Divisions within each Conference.  The number of Divisions within each Conference varies based on various geographical factors including distance and population. There is often more than one team within a specific geographical area. More dense Conferences are divided into a promotion/relegation structure with Division I and Division II.

2022 season

Premier Division

Champions

References

External links

 
United States Adult Soccer Association leagues
Soccer leagues in the United States
2011 establishments in the United States
Sports leagues established in 2011